Babylon is the second album by New Orleans R&B artist Dr. John.  In his autobiography, Under A Hoodoo Moon, Dr. John describes the origins of the album in detail:

"Our second album was cut in late 1968—the year of the Tet offensive, and of the assassinations of Bobby Kennedy and Martin Luther King Jr.  It was a heavy time for me:  Not only was the Vietnam War raging in all its insanity, but, as a semioutlaw, I was being pursued by various kinds of heat across L.A.  In its lyrics and music, this album reflects these chaotic days.  At times hard-driving, at other times following a deliberately spacy, disorienting groove, Babylon was the band's attempt to say something about the times—and to do it with a few unusual musical time signatures.  The lead song, "Babylon", sets the tone.  To a 3/4 and 10/4 groove, it lays out my own sick-ass view of the world then—namely, that I felt our number was up.  We were trying to get into something...with visions of the end of the world—as if Hieronymus Bosch had cut an album."

Track listing

Personnel
 Dr. John – vocals, keyboards, guitar, percussion
 Richard "Didimus" Washington – guitar, percussion
 Plas Johnson – saxophone
 Moe Bechamin – tenor saxophone
 Alvin Robinson – guitar
 Steve Mann – guitar
 Al Frazier – bass
 John Boudreaux – drums
 Ronnie Barron – organ
 Jessie Hill – backing vocals, percussion
 Shirley Goodman – backing vocals
 Tami Lynn – backing vocals
 John McAlister – quarter-tone piano, gongs, celesta
Technical
 Harold Battiste – producer, arranger
Stanislaw Zagorski - album design

References

1969 albums
Dr. John albums
Atco Records albums
Albums arranged by Harold Battiste
Albums produced by Harold Battiste
Albums recorded at Gold Star Studios
Rhythm and blues albums by American artists